Nellai College of Engineering (NCE), formerly National College of Engineering, is an engineering college in Maruthakulam, Tirunelveli, Tamil Nadu, India. It offers engineering at Bachelor and Master level. It is approved by AICTE and affiliated to Anna University. It is a Muslim minority institution run by Manarul Huda Trust. It is an ISO 9001:2008 certified institution. The college was inaugurated by the then Governor of Tamil Nadu, Justice Ms. M. Fathima Beevi on 7 September 2000.

Departments 
The following departments are available at Nellai College of Engineering
 Civil Engineering
 Electronics and Communication Engineering
 Electrical and Electronics Engineering
 Computer Science and Engineering
 Mechanical Engineering

References

External links

Engineering colleges in Tamil Nadu
All India Council for Technical Education
Colleges affiliated to Anna University
Education in Tirunelveli
Educational institutions established in 2000
2000 establishments in Tamil Nadu